Dunkin may refer to:

Dunking (biscuit)
Dunkin', also known as Dunkin' Donuts, American multinational quick service restaurant chain
Dunkin (surname)
 National Dunking Association, membership-based organization started by The Doughnut Corporation of America